Viviana Acquaviva (born June 5, 1979) is an Italian astrophysicist who is a professor in the Department of Physics at the New York City College of Technology. Her research interests consider data science and machine learning for physics and astronomy. She was named one of Italy's most inspirational technologists in 2019.

Early life and education 
Acquaviva studied physics at the University of Pisa, where she studied second order cosmological perturbations for her master thesis under the supervision of Sabino Matarrese and Paolo Paolicchi. She then moved to the International School for Advanced Studies for her PhD. She was a postdoctoral researcher at Princeton University and Rutgers University. Her research looked at dark energy, modified models of gravity. She also she trained in statistics and analysed cosmic microwave background data.

Research and career 
Acquaviva joined the faculty of City University of New York. Her research considers the development of computational tools to determine information about galaxy properties, including star formation history, the attenuation of dust and stellar mass. She created GalMC, a Markov chain Monte Carlo algorithm, that could be used to infer age, metallicity and star formation rate from spectral energy distribution (SED) fitting. She was part of Cosmic Assembly Near-infrared Deep Extragalactic Legacy Survey (CANDELS).  She has shown that machine learning models can be used to understand the relationship between galaxy spectra and the histories of their star formation.

Acquaviva seeks to improve diversity within the astrophysics community. She has led training programs for people from groups historically marginalized  from astrophysics, including people in correctional facilities.

Awards and honors 
 2017 Feliks Gross Award 
 2018 Italy 50 Most Influential Women in Tech
 2020 Top 50 Women in Computer Science
 2021 American Astronomical Society Harlow Shapley Visiting Lecturer
 2021 "Tecnovisionarie" Italian Women in AI

Selected publications

References 

Living people
Italian women physicists
University of Pisa alumni
International School for Advanced Studies alumni
1979 births
Italian astrophysicists
City University of New York faculty